Veljesto (or EYS "Veljesto", EYS Veljesto) is an association of Estonian university students, founded 24 February 1920 at Tartu in Estonia.

History
The society was founded by students who left the Estonian Students' Society. Among its more famous members are August Annist, Oskar Loorits, Harri Moora, Julius Mägiste, Ants Oras and Albert Kivikas.

Notable members

 Johannes Aavik
 August Annist
 Paul Ariste
 
 Pekka Erelt (:et)
 
 Tiit Hennoste
 Klaarika Kaldjärv
 Jaak Kangilaski
 Jaan Kangilaski (:et)
 
 Bernard Kangro
 Albert Kivikas
 Jaan Kivistik (:et)
 Aavo Kokk (:et)
 Alfred Koort 
 Janika Kronberg
 Mart Kuldkepp
 Marin Laak (:et)
 
 Marju Lauristin
 
 Harry Liivrand
 Jüri Lipping (:et)
 Timo Maran
 Aksel Mark
 Heinrich Mark
 Harri Moora
 Julius Mägiste 
 Pent Nurmekund
 Ants Oras
 
 Lauri Pilter
 Aare Pilv
 Linnar Priimägi
 Karl Ristikivi
 Elmar Salumaa
 August Sang
 
 Fanny de Sivers
 Albert Soosaar (:et)
 
 Ilmar Talve
 Heiti Talvik
 Helmut Tarand
 Mari Tarand
 
 
 
 Voldemar Vaga
 Tarmo Vahter (:et)
 
 Paul Viiding

References

External links 
 

University of Tartu
1920s establishments in Estonia
Student organizations established in 1920
Student organizations in Estonia